The Campania regional election of 1985 took place on 12 May 1985.

Events
Christian Democracy was by far the largest party, while the Italian Communist Party came distantly second. After the election Antonio Fantini, the incumbent Christian Democratic President, formed a new centre-left government (Pentapartito). In 1989 Fantini, who had been elected to the European Parliament, was replaced by fellow Christian Democrat Ferdinando Clemente.

Results

Source: Ministry of the Interior

Elections in Campania
1985 elections in Italy